Nicolás Alejandro Martínez Collazo (born 5 December 1997) is a Uruguayan professional footballer who plays as a defender.

Career
Martínez's career got underway with Sud América. After being an unused substitute for a Uruguayan Primera División fixture with Fénix on 4 February 2017, the defender made his pro debut a week later against Rampla Juniors. He was selected in four more matches by the club as they were relegated to the Segunda División. He featured nine times in 2018, two of which ended prematurely due to Martínez receiving a red card. He left the club by the end of the year.

In March 2019 it was confirmed, that Martínez was on a trial at the Swedish club IFK Göteborg. However, the club decided not to offer him a contract.

Career statistics
.

References

External links

1997 births
Living people
Footballers from Montevideo
Uruguayan footballers
Association football defenders
Uruguayan Primera División players
Uruguayan Segunda División players
Sud América players